Emiro Lobo (1948–2007) was a Venezuelan painter, graphic artist, and designer.

Awards and recognitions
Michelena Hall Award, Caracas.
2nd National Design Award in Mérida. CONAC.
I CONAC Hall Award "Chorus City" (1991).
Special Award, Lifetime Achievement Tribute I Lounge "Maria Luisa de Urbina Schirripa".
I Prize Drawing Room Small Format, Mérida, Mérida State (1996).
First Prize II Lounge "Cementos Caribe" (1990).
Second Prize, I Hall West, Mérida, Mérida State (1980).
Art Salon Prize Paraguaná Falcón State. Landscape mode (1981).
Second Prize Drawing III Hall West, Mérida (1982).

References 

People from Mérida, Mérida
1948 births
2007 deaths
Venezuelan artists
20th-century Venezuelan painters
20th-century Venezuelan male artists
Male painters